Paul Sebag (Tunisian Arabic: پول صباغ), born 26 September 1919 in Tunis and died 5 September 2004 in Paris, was a French-Tunisian sociologist and historian.

Biography 
After having begun studies in law and philosophy in Paris interrupted by World War II and the anti-Jewish laws of the Vichy regime, Paul Sebag in Tunisia took an important part in the action of the Tunisian Communist Party (PCT) against the partisans of Vichy. Arrested and tortured, he is sentenced by a Bizerte court for life. However, he spent only ten months in prison. Released in the aftermath of the allies' landings in North Africa on 8 November 1942, he resumed his political activity in the PCT illegally.

In 1943, after the Liberation, he became a journalist and edited the party newspaper. He then completed his studies and became, from 1947 to 1957, professor of letters at Lycée Carnot in Tunis. He also published several studies in urban sociology that led him to teach at the Institute of Advanced Studies of Tunis and the Faculty of Humanities and Social Sciences of Tunis. In 1977, due to the non-renewal of his contract by the Tunisian authorities, he obtained a job at the University of Rouen, where he worked for two years before claiming his pension rights. He devoted himself to his work as a historian and publishes various books devoted in particular to the history of Tunis and that of the Tunisian Jews.

In 1994, he was awarded the Tunisian Order of Cultural Merit.

A volume of posthumous homages is published in his honor in 2008.

Main publications

Personal works

Collaborative works

Text editions

References

External links 

 

Tunisian Jews
French people of Tunisian-Jewish descent
Jewish historians
French communists
French Marxist historians
French sociologists
Jews in the French resistance
Communist members of the French Resistance
Jewish Tunisian history
20th-century French journalists
Academic staff of Tunis University
Academic staff of the University of Rouen Normandy
20th-century French historians
1919 births
2004 deaths